Albert Richard Dalton (22 August 1891 – 30 January 1969) was an Australian rules footballer who played for the Geelong Football Club in the Victorian Football League (VFL).

Notes

External links 
		

1891 births
1969 deaths
Australian rules footballers from Victoria (Australia)
Geelong Football Club players
Barwon Football Club players